Over Seventy is an autobiographical work by P.G. Wodehouse, including a collection of articles originally from Punch magazine. It was first published in the United States on 3 May 1956 by Simon & Schuster, Inc., New York under the title America, I Like You, and in the United Kingdom, in a considerably expanded form, on October 11, 1957, by Herbert Jenkins, London, with the Over Seventy title and the subtitle An Autobiography with Digressions.

Much of the writing describes Wodehouse's feelings concerning the United States, his adopted homeland, with the journalism and stories inserted in context.

References

External links
The Russian Wodehouse Society's page

Books by P. G. Wodehouse
1956 non-fiction books
Herbert Jenkins books
British autobiographies